Minibar was a gay bar in Chicago, Illinois, in the United States, previously located at 3341 N. Halsted. It was opened in 2005 by John Dalton and Stu Zirin and closed in 2016.

Reception
In 2013, Out included Minibar in their list of the "200 of the Greatest Gay Bars in the World". The magazine said of the bar, "Attentive and, more importantly, hot model-esque guys serve your every whim—from delicious cotton candy martinis to paninis. In the heart of the gay filled Halsted Street, walk upstairs and tilt your head back for a stunning light show in this attractive, modern lounge."

References

Defunct LGBT drinking establishments in the United States
Drinking establishments in Illinois
Gay culture in Illinois
LGBT culture in Chicago
LGBT history in Illinois